The Women's individual pursuit was held on 18 October 2015.

Results

Qualifying
The fastest 4 competitors qualify for the medal finals.

 QG = qualified for gold medal final
 QB = qualified for bronze medal final

Finals
The final classification is determined in the medal finals.

References

Women's individual pursuit
European Track Championships – Women's individual pursuit